The Warmth of the Sun is a 2007 compilation of music by The Beach Boys released through Capitol Records.  A companion to 2003's Sounds of Summer: The Very Best of The Beach Boys, The Warmth of the Sun is composed of fan favorites and hits that were left off its predecessor. Several songs were remixed in stereo for the first time. These are "All Summer Long", "You're So Good to Me", "Then I Kissed Her", "Please Let Me Wonder", and "Let Him Run Wild".  The song "Wendy" appears as a new stereo remix with its middle eight cough edited out.  This album also features an alternate mix of "Break Away" and the single versions of "Why Do Fools Fall In Love" and "Cool, Cool Water".

The Warmth of the Sun debuted at number 40 on the Billboard 200, selling 14,000 copies in its first week.

Track listing
"All Summer Long"  (Brian Wilson, Mike Love [1964]) - 2:09
"Catch a Wave"  (B. Wilson, Love [1963]) - 2:08
"Hawaii"  (B. Wilson, Love [1963]) - 2:00
"Little Honda"  (B. Wilson, Love [1964]) - 1:52
"409"  (B. Wilson, Gary Usher, Love [1962]) - 2:00
"It's O.K." (B. Wilson, Love [1976]) - 2:12
"You're So Good to Me"  (B. Wilson, Love [1965]) - 2:15
"Then I Kissed Her"  (Jeff Barry, Ellie Greenwich, Phil Spector [1965]) - 2:16
"Kiss Me, Baby"  (B. Wilson, Love [1965]) - 2:43
"Please Let Me Wonder"  (B. Wilson, Love [1965]) - 2:50
"Let Him Run Wild"  (B. Wilson [1965]) - 2:20
"The Little Girl I Once Knew"  (B. Wilson [1965]) - 2:34
"Wendy"  (B. Wilson, Love [1964]) - 2:20
"Disney Girls (1957)" (Bruce Johnston [1971]) - 4:07
"Forever" (Dennis Wilson, Gregg Jakobson [1970]) - 2:41
"Friends" (B. Wilson, D. Wilson, Carl Wilson, Al Jardine [1968]) - 2:32
"Break Away" (B. Wilson, Reggie Dunbar [1969]) - 3:05
"Why Do Fools Fall in Love"  (Morris Levy, Frankie Lymon [1964]) - 2:07
"Surf's Up" (B. Wilson, Van Dyke Parks [1971]) - 4:12
"Feel Flows" (C. Wilson, Jack Rieley [1971]) - 4:46
"All This Is That" (C. Wilson, Love, Jardine [1972]) - 3:57
"'Til I Die" (B. Wilson [1971]) - 2:40
"Sail On, Sailor" (B. Wilson, Parks, Rieley, Ray Kennedy, Tandyn Almer [1973]) - 3:16
"Cool, Cool Water" (B. Wilson, Love [1970]) - 3:24
"Don't Go Near the Water" (Love, Jardine [1971]) - 2:39
"California Saga (On My Way To Sunny Californ-i-a) (Jardine [1973]) - 3:22
"California Dreamin''" (John Phillips, Michelle Phillips [1986]) - 3:24
"The Warmth of the Sun" (B. Wilson, Love [1964]) - 2:50

References

2007 greatest hits albums
The Beach Boys compilation albums